Frank Scott Bunnell High School is an accredited high school in Stratford, Connecticut, United States. The school serves students in grades 9 through 12 as part of Stratford Public Schools. The school mascot is the bulldog, and the school colors are blue, gold and white.

Notable alumni
 John Hirschbeck (1972) Major League Baseball umpire
 Mark Hirschbeck (1977) Major League Baseball umpire 
 Javier Colon (1995) American singer/songwriter; winner of season 1 of The Voice
 Nakiea Miller (1997) professional basketball player
 Marcus Easley (2005) NFL football player
 Mark Harrison (2009) professional football player
-9

Recognitions

The Bunnell High School Football team won back to back state championships in 2006 and 2007.

See also
Stratford High School

References

External links

Buildings and structures in Stratford, Connecticut
Schools in Fairfield County, Connecticut
Public high schools in Connecticut
Educational institutions established in 1960
1960 establishments in Connecticut